William Guy (1810–1885) was a British physician and medical statistician.

William Guy may also refer to:

 William Guy (dentist) (1859–1950), British pioneer of modern dentistry
 William Guy (golfer) (born 1966), Scottish professional golfer
 William Henry Guy (1890–1968), British Labour Party politician
 William L. Guy (1919–2013), governor of the U.S. state of North Dakota
 William Ray Guy or Ray Guy (1949–2022), American football player